Henry Edward "Hank" Ciesla (October 15, 1934 in St. Catharines, Ontario – April 22, 1976) was a Canadian  professional ice hockey forward who played 269 games in the National Hockey League.  He played for the Chicago Black Hawks and New York Rangers.

Transfer History

• September, 1955: Rights traded to Chicago by Buffalo (AHL) for $15,000 with Montreal receiving Bob Duncan (Toronto/OHA-Jr.) and Toronto receiving Gary Collins (Kitchener/OHA-Jr).

• June, 1957: Traded to NY Rangers by Chicago for Ron Murphy.

• October 3, 1959: Traded to Toronto by NY Rangers with Bill Kennedy and future considerations for Noel Price.

• August, 1961: Traded to Cleveland (AHL) by Toronto (Rochester-AHL) for Bill Dineen and cash.

• June 4, 1963: Claimed by Detroit (Pittsburgh-AHL) from Cleveland (AHL) in Inter-League Draft.

• October 10, 1964: Traded to Chicago (Buffalo-AHL) by Detroit (Pittsburgh-AHL) for Jerry Toppazzini.

Career statistics

References

External links 

1934 births
1976 deaths
Canadian ice hockey centres
Chicago Blackhawks players
Sportspeople from St. Catharines
New York Rangers players
Ice hockey people from Ontario